is a railway station in the city of Toyokawa, Aichi, Japan, operated by Meitetsu.

Lines

Station layout
The station has one island platform with both tracks terminating at the end of the platform. The station has automated ticket machines, Manaca automated turnstiles and is staffed.

Platforms

Adjacent stations

Station history
It was renamed Toyokawa-inari on May 1, 1955. At the end of 1984, the platforms were lengthened to accommodate six-car trains.

Passenger statistics
In fiscal 2017, the station was used by an average of 2592 passengers daily.

Surrounding area
 Toyokawa Inari
Tobu Junior High School

See also
 List of Railway Stations in Japan

References

External links

 Official web page 

Railway stations in Japan opened in 1954
Railway stations in Aichi Prefecture
Stations of Nagoya Railroad
Toyokawa, Aichi